George Donnelly may refer to:

 George Donnelly (footballer) (born 1988), English footballer
 George Donnelly (American football) (1942–2022), American football player 
 George Joseph Donnelly (1889–1950), American Roman Catholic clergyman